Hugo Norberto Coria Boianello (born 1 April 1961) is a former Argentine football player and manager. He played football for San Martín de Mendoza and C.D. Águila.

Coria has had two spells as manager of C.D. Águila in El Salvador.

Honours

Manager

Club
C.D. Águila
 Primera División
 Champion: Apertura 1999, Apertura 2000
 Runners-up: Apertura 2003

C.D. Luis Ángel Firpo
 Primera División
 Runners-up: Clausura 2007

References

External links
 Hugo Coria at Soccerway 

1961 births
Living people
Argentine footballers
Argentine football managers
San Martín de Mendoza footballers
C.D. Águila managers
C.D. Águila footballers
Expatriate footballers in El Salvador
C.D. Luis Ángel Firpo managers
Municipal Limeño managers
Expatriate football managers in El Salvador
Association football forwards